Gruts  is an album by Ivor Cutler, originally released in 1986 on Rough Trade Records.

Track listing

"I'm Happy"
"Gruts for Tea"
"A Red Flower"
"Shoplifters"
"How to Make a Friend"
"Fish Fright"
"Darling, Will You Marry Me Twice"
"Scratch My Back"
"Egg Meat"
"Mud"
"Old Cups of Tea"
"The Judge's Parcel"
"I Had a Little Boat"
"The Hoorgi House"
"A Steady Job"
"In My Room There Sits a Box"
"The Dirty Dinner"

External links
explanation and text of "Gruts for Tea"

Ivor Cutler albums
1986 albums
Rough Trade Records albums